Pre-Emptive Denial is a live album by saxophonist Tim Berne's Paraphrase which was recorded at The Stone in 2005 and released on Berne's Screwgun label.

Reception
The AllMusic review awarded the album 4 stars.

Track listing
All compositions by Tim Berne
 "Trading on All Fours" - 24:08   
 "We Bow to Royalties" - 24:22

Personnel
Tim Berne - alto saxophone, baritone saxophone
Drew Gress - bass
Tom Rainey - drums

References 

2005 live albums
Tim Berne live albums
Screwgun Records live albums